Colonel Thomas Francis Bruce Renny-Tailyour  (8 June 1863 – 10 June 1937) was a British Army officer and surveyor.

Renny-Tailyour was born at Borrowfield, the family estate near to Montrose in Forfarshire, the son of an officer of the Bengal Engineers. He was educated at Cheltenham College and the Royal Military Academy, Woolwich and was commissioned into the Royal Engineers in 1883. He served in Burma from 1885 to 1889. In 1888 he joined the Indian Army Survey Department, with which he stayed for the rest of his career. He became deputy superintendent in 1891, assistant surveyor-general in 1904, and superintendent in 1910. He served in the Boxer Rebellion in 1901. He was promoted brevet colonel in 1906.

He was appointed Companion of the Order of the Star of India (CSI) in 1911 and Companion of the Order of the Bath (CB) in the 1920 New Year Honours shortly before his retirement.

Footnotes

References
Obituary, The Times, 11 June 1937

1863 births
1937 deaths
People from Angus, Scotland
People educated at Cheltenham College
Graduates of the Royal Military Academy, Woolwich
Royal Engineers officers
Companions of the Order of the Star of India
Companions of the Order of the Bath
Scottish surveyors
British military personnel of the Boxer Rebellion
British military personnel of the Third Anglo-Burmese War
Scottish military personnel